The University of Cape Town (UCT) is a public research university in Cape Town, South Africa. Established in 1829 as the South African College, it was granted full university status in 1918, making it the oldest university in South Africa and the oldest university in Sub-Saharan Africa in continuous operation.

UCT is organised in 57 departments across six faculties offering bachelor's (NQF 7) to doctoral degrees (NQF 10) solely in the English language. Home to 30 000 students, it encompasses six campuses in the Capetonian suburbs of Rondebosch, Hiddingh, Observatory, Mowbray, and the Waterfront. 

Although UCT was founded by a private act of Parliament in 1918, the Statute of the University of Cape Town (issued in 2002 in terms of the Higher Education Act) sets out its structure and roles and places the Chancellor - currently, Dr Precious Moloi Motsepe - as the ceremonial figurehead and invests real leadership authority in the Vice Chancellor who is accountable to the University Council. 

A vibrant student community consisting of over 100 societies and clubs caters to diverse interests such as religion, politics, culture, community outreach and sport. UCT prominently appears in national leagues such as, but not limited to, the Varsity Cup. The historic academic, sporting, and political rivalry between UCT and Stellenbosch University brought about the nickname 'Ikeys', originally an anti-Semitic epithet for students of the university.

UCT is consistently the highest-ranked African university in the QS World University Rankings, the Times Higher Education World University Rankings, and the Academic Ranking of World Universities. Its Commerce, Law, and Medicine Faculties are consistently placed among the hundred best internationally. It is the only African member of the Global University Leaders Forum (GULF) within the World Economic Forum, which is made up of 26 of the world's top universities. 

Five alumni, staff members, and researchers associated with UCT have won the Nobel Prize. As of March 2020, 35 UCT staff members are A-rated researchers according to the National Research Foundation of South Africa (almost 30% of the national total), which is the most prestigious ranking possible in the NRF rating classification scheme, a recognition of researchers who are unequivocally recognised by their peers as leading international scholars in their field for the high quality and impact of their recent research outputs. 88 staff members are part of the Academy of Sciences of South Africa.

History

Early history 
The University of Cape Town was founded at a meeting in the Groote Kerk in 1829 as the South African College, a high school for young men. The college had a small tertiary-education facility, introduced in 1874 that grew substantially after 1880, when the discovery of gold and diamonds in the north - and the resulting demand for skills in mining - gave it the financial boost it needed to grow. The college developed into a fully fledged university during the period 1880 to 1900, thanks to increased funding from private sources and the government.

During these years, the college built its first dedicated science laboratories, and started the departments of mineralogy and geology to meet the need for skilled personnel in the country's emerging diamond and gold-mining industries. The UCT crest was designed in 1859 by Charles Davidson Bell, Surveyor-General of the Cape Colony at the time. Bell was an accomplished artist who also designed medals and the triangular Cape stamp. Another key development during this period was the admission of women. In 1886 the Professor of Chemistry, Paul Daniel Hahn, convinced the council to admit four women into his chemistry class on a trial basis. Owing to the exceptional standard of work by the women students, the college decided to admit women students permanently in honour of Queen Victoria's Diamond Jubilee in 1887.

The years 1902 to 1918 saw the establishment of the Medical School, the introduction of engineering courses and a Department of Education. UCT was formally established as a university in 1918, on the basis of the Alfred Beit bequest and additional substantial gifts from mining magnates Julius Wernher and Otto Beit. The new university also attracted substantial support from well-wishers in the Cape Town area and, for the first time, a significant state grant.

In 1928, the university was able to move the bulk of its facilities to Groote Schuur on the slopes of Devil's Peak, on land bequeathed to the nation by Cecil John Rhodes as the site for a national university. UCT celebrated its centenary the following year.

Apartheid era 

Apart from establishing itself as a leading research and teaching university in the decades that followed, UCT earned itself the nickname "Moscow on the Hill" during the period 1960 to 1990 for its sustained opposition to apartheid, particularly in higher education.

The university admitted its first small group of black students in the 1920s. The number of black students remained relatively low until the 1980s and 90s, when the institution, reading and welcoming the signs of change in the country, committed itself to a deliberate and planned process of internal transformation. From the 1980s to the early 1990s, the number of black students admitted to the university rose by 35 percent. By 2004, nearly half of UCT's 20,000 students were black and just under half of the student body was female. Today the university boasts having one of the most diverse campuses in South Africa.

Post-Apartheid era 

Rhodes Must Fall (#RhodesMustFall on social media) was a protest movement that began on 9 March 2015, originally directed against a statue at the University of Cape Town (UCT) that commemorates Cecil Rhodes. The campaign for the statue's removal received global attention and led to a wider movement to "decolonise" education across South Africa. On 9 April 2015, following a UCT Council vote the previous night, the statue was removed.

#FeesMustFall was a student protest movement which was arguably indirectly inspired by the RhodesMustFall. It formally began at the University of the Witwatersrand and spread to UCT and Rhodes University and then the rest of the South African universities.  It called for the abolition of tuition fee increases for the 2016 academic year. Diverse demands arose such as the abolition of fees and decolonisation of higher education which led to substantial changes at South African public universities. At UCT, the Senate began a widespread curriculum reform process and the university began the process of the renaming of buildings on campus (the most notable example was when Jameson Hall was renamed to Sarah Baartman Hall in 2019).

In September 2019, Film and Media studies student Uyinene Mrwetyana went missing. After the community and police began searching, her body was discovered in the Cape Flats area of Cape Town and Luyanda Botha was arrested and convicted for her rape and murder. Her death and the rape and death of other women precipitated widespread public outcry that led to a campus shutdown and protests on campus, at the Parliament precinct in Cape Town CBD and at campuses around South Africa. Subsequently, President Ramaphosa announced reforms such as harsher punishments for sex offenders and the public disclosure of the National Register for Sex Offenders to stem sexual and physical violence against women and children. Moreover, the Uyinene Mrwetyana Foundation was established and a special fund in her name was created to provide scholarships to female students in the Humanities Faculty.

In March 2020, UCT opened the Neuroscience Institute at the Groote Schuur Hospital in collaboration with the Western Cape Provincial Government, the first dedicated cross- and interdisciplinary centre for the study of and development of treatments for neurological and mental disorders in Africa.

Campus 

The main teaching campus, known as Upper Campus, is located on the Rhodes Estate on the slopes of Devil's Peak. This campus contains, in a relatively compact site, the faculties of Science, Engineering, Commerce, and Humanities (except for the arts departments), as well as Smuts Hall and Fuller Hall residences. Upper Campus is centered on Sarah Baartman Hall, the location for graduation and other ceremonial events, as well as many examinations. The original buildings and layout of Upper Campus were designed by JM Solomon and built between 1928 and 1930. Since that time, many more buildings have been added as the university has grown. Upper Campus is also home to the main library, The Chancellor Oppenheimer Library, which holds the majority of the university's 1.3 million volume collection.

Contiguous with Upper Campus, but separated from it by university sports fields and the M3 expressway, are the Middle and Lower Campuses. These campuses, which are spread through the suburbs of Rondebosch, Rosebank and Mowbray, contain the Law faculty, the South African College of Music, the School of Economics, most of the student residences, most of the university administrative offices, and various sporting facilities. The state of the art artificial grass soccer field has been approved by FIFA for training for World Cup teams. The Upper, Middle and Lower Campuses together are often referred to as the "main campus".

The Faculty of Health Sciences is located on the Medical School campus next to the Groote Schuur Hospital in Observatory. The Fine Arts and Drama departments are located on the Hiddingh Campus in central Cape Town. The university's original building, now known as the Egyptian Building, on the Hiddingh campus, was built in the Egyptian Revival style. The only other campus built in this style was the Medical College of Virginia in Richmond, Virginia in the United States. The UCT Graduate School of Business is located on the Breakwater Lodge Campus at the Victoria & Alfred Waterfront.

The Baxter Theatre Centre, located on the Lower Campus, is part of the University of Cape Town; it is also the second largest performing arts complex in Cape Town, after the Artscape Theatre Centre. It has three venues:
the 665-seat Main Theatre
the 638-seat Concert Hall, with a Von Beckerath organ
the 172-seat Golden Arrow Studio

For his contribution of the tract of land which the campus was founded on, a bronze statue of Cecil Rhodes was erected in 1934 on the Upper Campus, overlooking the university's rugby fields. The statue was removed in April 2015 following pressure from student groups due to its representation of South Africa's colonialist apartheid past and the university's inadequate representation of black students, faculty, and staff.

The upper campus was affected by the Table Mountain fire in April 2021; the Jagger Library building, which housed rare books and documents including a large African Studies collection, was gutted.

Residential halls
The university has 19 student residences (or "res" as known colloquially), offering both single-gender and mixed-gender housing. The Department of Student Housing oversees the residence system College House is the oldest university residence in Africa, having been established in 1887. UCT's residence system is composed of three tiers. Students living in residence are placed in a tier according to the length of time that they have been in the residence system, studying in the university and service or part-time employment in a residence. As a student progresses through their academic journey they are moved into a higher tier. Postgraduate students are usually housed in the third-tier residences unless employed in lower-tier residences.

First-tier residences:

 Avenue Road Residence
 Baxter Hall
 Clarinus Village
 College House
 Dullah Omar Hall
 Fuller Hall
 Glendover Residence
 Graça Machel Hall
 Kilindini
 Kopano Residence 
 Leo Marquard Hall
 Rochester House
 Smuts Hall
 Tugwell Hall
 University House
 Varietas

Second-tier residences:

 Forest Hill
 Groote Schuur Flats
 Groote Schuur Residence
 Liesbeeck Gardens
 Medical Residence
 Obz Square
 The Woolsack

Third-tier residences:

 1 Woodbine Road
 8 Avenue Road
 Amalinda
 Dullah Omar Hall
 Edwin Hart Annex
 F Block (Forest Hill)
 Harold Cressy Hall
 Inglewood
 JP Duminy Court
 Linkoping
 North Grange
 Rondeberg
 TB Davie Court

Organisation

Administration and governance

The University of Cape Town was originally incorporated as a public university by a private act of Parliament in 1918. At present it is incorporated and structured by an institutional statute issued under the provisions of the Higher Education Act, 1997.

The titular head of the university is the Chancellor; this is a ceremonial position without executive power. The primary role of the Chancellor is to confer degrees on behalf of the university, and to represent the university to the rest of the world. The current Chancellor is fashion entrepreneur and philanthropist Dr Precious Moloi-Motsepe who was elected in November 2019 and assumed the role on 1 January 2020 after the expiration of Ms Graça Machel's second consecutive 10-year term.

The University Council is the highest ranked decision-making and appointative structure in the university. With wide-ranging powers of governance over areas such as the strategy, well-being and mission of the university, it is directly accountable to the Government of the Republic through the Minister of Higher Education, currently Dr Blade Nzimande for matters relating to the university. It is composed of 30 broad stakeholder representatives such as students, academics, staff and appointees of the City of Cape Town, Convocation, Premier of the Western Cape and the Minister of Higher Education among others, and the presiding officer of the council, the chair, is currently Babalwa Ngonyama. The Registrar, who acts as the secretary of the Council and Senate, oversees academic registration and legal matters, and administers the Convocation, is currently Royston Pillay.

The Convocation, composed of alumni, the Vice Chancellor, Deputy Vice Chancellors, academic staff, emeritus professors and emeritus associate professors, is a statutory body administered by the Office of the Registrar, which provides a platform for former members of the university to participate and engage with matters affecting the university. Helmed by the President of the Convocation, currently Mr Kassi Carl Manlan, it can make recommendations and pass non-binding resolutions in its Annual General Meetings.

The Leadership Lekgotla is a coordinating and decision-making structure composed of senior executives of the university who oversee the day-to-day running of the university. It contrasts with the University Council which arises from the University Statute and exercises supreme governance over the university. The Leadership Lekgotla's members are senior executives who oversee different areas of the university's operations and policies.  The most senior executive is the Vice Chancellor (ranked below the Chancellor in the ceremonial protocol and order of precedence of the university) is the de facto head and chief executive of the university, (currently held in an acting capacity since Prof Mamokgethi Phakeng's term was ended on 3 March 2023), who is accountable to the council. Below the Vice Chancellor are the Deputy Vice Chancellors of Transformation (currently Professor Elelwani Ramugondo), of Research and Internationalisation (currently Prof Susanne Harris) and of Teaching and Learning (currently Professor Harsha Kathard, acting). The Chief Operations Officer, currently Dr Reno Morar, brings together and oversees the functional, support and technical areas of the university's operations.

Academic divisions
The university is composed of six Faculties (Commerce, Engineering and the Built Environment, Health Sciences, Law, Sciences and Humanities) which together comprise 57 departments. Faculties are helmed by a Dean and their administrative and operational matters are administered by a Director. The Senate has delegated substantial powers to the faculties in academic matters over their internal protocol and management  such as on matters concerning class timetables, admission requirements, academic exclusion, examinations, research projects and so on. Faculties vary substantially in student size and in buildings occupied, with the Commerce faculty having the highest student population and the Law faculty having the lowest while the Humanities faculty spans the most buildings followed by the Faculty of Health Sciences with the Commerce and Law faculties having (by far) the lowest physical footprint.

Notwithstanding interdisciplinary research units and centers, additional academic structures exist that eschew the faculty-based organisational structure. The multidisciplinary Center for Higher Education Development ranks on an equal level as the faculties and the UCT Graduate School of Business maintains substantial latitude over its internal affairs despite being nominally part of the Faculty of Commerce. The interdisciplinary School of Information Technology, comprising the Departments of Information Systems and of Computer Science in the Commerce and Science faculties is neither a faculty nor a department but a coordinating mechanism to promote IT education and research.

The departments of the faculties are listed as follows:

 
Faculty of Commerce
 College of Accounting
 School of Economics (jointly established with Faculty of Humanities)
 Department of Finance and Tax
 Department of Information Systems
 The Nelson Mandela School of Public Governance
 School of Management Studies
 Education Development Unit
 Graduate School of Business

Faculty of Engineering and the Built Environment

 Department of Architecture, Planning and Geomatics
 Department of Chemical Engineering
 Department of Civil Engineering
 Department of Construction Economics and Management
 Department of Electrical Engineering
 Department of Mechanical Engineering

Faculty of Health Sciences

 Department of Anaesthesia and Perioperative Medicine
 Department of Health and Rehabilitation Sciences
 Department of Health Sciences Education
 Department of Human Biology
 Department of Integrative Biomedical Sciences
 Department of Medicine
 Department of Obstetrics and Gynaecology
 Department of Paediatrics and Child Health
 Department of Pathology
 Department of Psychiatry and Mental Health
 Department of Public Health and Family Medicine
 Department of Radiation Medicine
 Department of Surgery

Faculty of Humanities

 African Feminist Studies 
 Anthropology 
 African Studies and Linguistics
 Centre for Film and Media Studies
 Education Development Unit 
 English Literary Studies
 Historical Studies 
 Knowledge and Information Stewardship
 Michaelis School of Fine Art
 Department of Philosophy
 Department of Political Studies
 School of Education
 Department of Psychology
 School of Languages and Literatures
 Department of Social Work & Social Development
 Department of Sociology
 South African College of Music
 Department for the Study of Religions
 Theatre, Dance and Performance Studies 

Faculty of Law
 Department of Commercial Law
 Department of Private Law
 Department of Public Law

Faculty of Science

 Department of Archaeology
 Department of Astronomy
 Department of Biological Sciences
 Department of Chemistry
 Department of Computer Science
 Department of Environmental and Geographical Science
 Department of Geological Sciences
 Department of Mathematics and Applied Mathematics
 Department of Molecular and Cell Biology
 Department of Oceanography
 Department of Physics
 Department of Statistical Sciences

Funding 

The university's endowment (the financial capital and investment funds on which it can draw to carry out its work) is deposited with the UCT Foundation (a legally independent nonprofit organisation) and it is managed by the Investment Office. Through the Distinguishing UCT fundraising campaign, the university is trying to raise its endowment. As of 2019, its designated endowment stands at R2.5 billion and its undesignated endowment stands at R676 million with R133 million raised for infrastructure projects (bringing the total undesignated endowment to R809 million which the university aims to increase to R1 billion).

There have been several campaigns at the university to divest its endowment. Fossil Free UCT was formally established in 2015 as a campaign by environmental activism lobbying groups and student organisations, most notably the Green Campus Initiative compel UCT to divest from fossil fuel companies which resulted in a non-binding resolution passed by UCT's Convocation in 2017 to support the divestment. Student lobby groups, most notably the Palestinian Solidarity Front and the SRC called on the university's management to divest from Israeli companies and organisations working in the Palestinian Occupied Territories (among other demands), which, in the end, the university refused to do.

The university's income comes from a combination of government grants, tuition fees, donations, investment and research income. In the 2017–2018 financial year, the university received R1.415 billion in state subsidies, R1.428 billion in tuition fees and R539 million in other income. R1.2 billion was committed to student financial aid for both undergraduate and postgraduate students from the university, the government through the NSFAS scheme and the university's partners and donors.

Students and staff 

, there were 27,907 students; 25% of whom were black South African, 22% were white South African, 18% identified as another race, 15% were international students. In 2016 there were 29,074 students enrolled (18,421 undergraduates and 10,653 postgraduates) and 4,542 staff were employed (1,179 academic and 3,363 professional, administrative, support and service staff).

The UCT Employment Equity Plan April (2010 to 2015) indicated moderate but consistent changes in the demographic makeup of the staff body. The five-year plan specified specific targets ranging from between about 5% to 10% adjustments in the representation of SA black staff. According to the plan the staff makeup would have changed by 2015 by achieving either parity or more SA black staff than SA white in all categories other than senior lecturer and professor positions.

UCT spokesperson Elijah Moholola noted that, in 2017, UCT employed 45 white professors, 38 black African, Cape Coloured or Indian South African professors, 67 foreign national professors and 7 who did not disclose their race.

Student enrolment 2009-2013
Student enrolment by population group 2009–2013, showing percentage growth on base:

Student life 
UCT had 36 different sports clubs in 2003, including team sports, individual sports, extreme sports and martial arts.

The university's sports teams, in particular the rugby union team, are known as the "Ikey Tigers" or the "Ikeys". The "Ikey" nickname originated in the 1910s as an anti-semitic epithet applied to UCT students by the students of Stellenbosch University, because of the supposed large number of Jewish students at UCT. Stellenbosch is UCT's traditional rugby opponent; an annual "Intervarsity" match is played between the two universities. The University of Cape Town Football Club also known as the "Ikeys Warriors" is the main team for association football (soccer), representing the university at tournaments such as Varsity Football.

As of 2007 there were more than 80 student societies at UCT, falling into five categories: 
 Academic societies for those interested in a particular field of study or studying a particular topic: The most prominent of these include the History and Current Affairs Society (HCA), the Space and Astronomy Society (SpaceSoc, also a SEDS South Africa chapter), the United Nations Association of South Africa (UNASA), and the Students for Law and Social Justice (SLSJ).
 Political societies, including branches of the youth wings of national political parties such as the South African Students Congress (SASCO), the Democratic Alliance Students Organisation (DASO), and the African National Congress Youth League.
 Religious societies, some of which are associated with religious denominations or local places of worship.
 National/cultural societies for students from particular countries or particular ethnic backgrounds.
 Special interest societies (such as RainbowUCT, the university's LGBTI society, UCT Mountain & Ski Club, UCT Ballroom and Latin dancing) for those interested in various activities or issues.

In addition to the plethora of student societies, there are several student organisations dedicated to the development of communities surrounding the university in the Cape Metropolitan Area. Some of the biggest include: SHAWCO, Ubunye and RAG. Recently, several students movements have developed, such as the Green Campus Initiative.

Rankings 

The University of Cape Town is the most prestigious African university according to several rankings. It achieved a rank of 198 in the 2019 QS World University Rankings, a rank of 156 in the 2019 Times Higher Education World University Rankings, and a rank of 201–300 in the Shanghai Academic Ranking of World Universities, making it the highest-ranked African university in these rankings.

The faculty of Commerce as well as the faculty of Law and Medicine have appeared in the top 100 faculties internationally. The Law Faculty achieved a global rank of 40 in the 2014 QS World University Rankings by Subject. Although the university remains the highest ranking in Africa as of 2022 its ranking has been declining since 2015.
  
QS World University Rankings
Times Higher Education World University Rankings

Affiliations 
UCT is a member of the Worldwide Universities Network (WUN), the Association of African Universities, the Association of Commonwealth Universities, the Cape Higher Education Consortium, Higher Education South Africa, the International Alliance of Research Universities (IARU), the African Research Universities Alliance (ARUA) and the International Association of Universities.

The Faculty of Law is a member of the Law Schools Global League (LSGL).

Notable alumni and staff

Five alumni of the University of Cape Town have been awarded Nobel Prizes: Ralph Bunche, American political scientist and diplomat awarded the Nobel Peace Prize in 1950 for his role in the 1949 Armistice Agreements, Professor Allan McLeod Cormack, physicist awarded the Nobel Prize in Medicine (1979) for his work on X-ray computed tomography, Max Theiler, virologist awarded the Nobel Prize in Physiology or Medicine in 1951 for developing a vaccine against yellow fever, Sir Aaron Klug, chemist and biophysicist awarded the Nobel Prize in Chemistry (1982) for his development of crystallographic electron microscopy and his structural elucidation of biologically important nucleic acid-protein complexes and Professor Emeritus J. M. Coetzee (Literature, 2003).

UCT alumni have gone on to achieve positions in academica, politics and other fields as follows. According to a non-peer reviewed study conducted by the Mail & Guardian in 2018, 6% of members of the Parliament of South Africa obtained a degree from UCT (the study had a sample of 247 out of 449 MPs). Ministers of the Cabinet of South Africa, Naledi Pandor and Ebrahim Patel, former Vice President of the World Bank and former Vice Chancellor of UCT, Mamphela Ramphele, South African surgeon Christiaan Barnard, South African writer Breyten Breytenbach, South African entrepreneur and inventor behind Ubuntu, Mark Shuttleworth, South African activist and judge Albie Sachs, former member of the South African music band Freshlyground, Zolani Mahola, South African cartoonist Zapiro and former Speaker of the National Assembly of South Africa, Baleka Mbete are among the alumni of the university. Kindly refer to List of Notable Alumni of the University of Cape Town for further information on notable UCT alumni.

The National Research Foundation of South Africa rates researchers and academics according to the quality of their research output in four categories. , 35 staff are A-rated, that being they are internationally recognised leaders in their fields. These are 30% of the A-rated researchers recognised by the NRF, making UCT, by far, the university with the highest number of such researchers. 6 researchers are recognised as P-rated, that being they have potential to become leaders in their fields. , 15% of South Africa's total NRF-rated researchers (about 524) are employed or associated with UCT. For a comprehensive and up-to-date list of B, Y and C-rated researchers, see this site.

, 19% of South African Research Chairs Initiative (SARChI) research chairs (about 42 academics) are held by UCT employed or associated researchers. 88 members of faculty are members of the Academy of Sciences of South Africa. Notable staff members include Minister of Trade and Industry, Ebrahim Patel, Minister of International Relations and Cooperation, Naledi Pandor, former Premier of the Western Cape, Helen Zille and George Ellis, collaborator with Stephen Hawking and winner of the 2004 Templeton Prize, was a professor of applied mathematics in the Faculty of Sciences. For a larger albeit inexhaustive list of former and current notable UCT faculty and staff, see  the List of University of Cape Town faculty.

Notable research 

 The Department of Mathematics and Applied Mathematics is an international centre for research in the fields of cosmology and topology.
 The Centre for Rhetoric Studies, the only one of its kind on the African Continent (director: Philippe-Joseph Salazar).
 The Department of Physics is home to the UCT-CERN research centre, which is partially responsible for the software design of the High Level Trigger component of the ALICE experiment at the Large Hadron Collider, as well as other activities related to ALICE.
 The Department of Electrical Engineering is involved in the development of technology for the Karoo Array Telescope (KAT). KAT is a precursor to the Square Kilometer Array, a proposed International project to build the world's largest radio telescope by 2020. Research groups in RF design and digital design contribute to the RF front-end and digital back-end of the KAT project.
 The Institute of Infectious Disease and Molecular Medicine (IIDMM) is engaged in research on candidate tuberculosis vaccines, and is developing candidate HIV vaccines matched to the South African epidemic.
 The OpenUCT Initiative is funded by the Andrew W. Mellon Foundation and works to make UCT's research, teaching and learning materials openly available online. Major research projects include the African Climate Development Initiative (ACDI) pilot curation project, Digital Scholarship in Emerging Knowledge Domains and Open Data in the Governance of South African Higher Education and Scholarly Communication in Africa (SCAP)
 The Department of Archaeology has found some of the oldest evidence of art and abstract thought in the world. Specifically, engrained ostrich eggshell water containers dated to 60,000 years ago
The African Centre for Cities is one of the few research organisations focusing on urbanism in Africa.
On 21 September 2020 the new Khoi and San Centre was launched, with an undergraduate degree programme planned to be rolled out in coming years. The centre will support and consolidate this collaborative work on research commissions on language (including Khoekhoegowab), sacred human remains, land and gender.

Controversies

The “Mafeje Affair” 

University of Cape Town Council's decision to rescind Archie Mafeje's (black) offer for a senior lecturer position due to pressure from the Apartheid government has angered students and led to protests on 15 August 1968 followed by a nine days sit-in at UCT administration building. Protesters faced intimidation from the government, anti-protestors and fellow Afrikaans students from other universities. The police swiftly squashed support for the sit-in. In the aftermath, Mafeje left the country and did not return until 2000.

Rhodes Must Fall 
A debate at UCT over the removal of a statue of Cecil Rhodes spawned Rhodes Must Fall movement. The FeesMustFall movement, which began at Wits and spread to UCT, was inspired by the Rhodes Must Fall protests.

Destruction and censorship of art 
Since the removal of the Rhodes statue, other art has been removed or destroyed. FeesMustFall students burned 23 of the university's historical paintings in February 2016.

According to GroundUp, art experts connected to the university are concerned about intolerance towards art at the institution, as UCT has removed and censored 75 further "vulnerable" art which it claims are offensive to students.

An Artworks Task Team was set up in September 2015 to assess art at the university "with a view to transformation and inclusivity", and went about finding "artworks on campus that may be seen to recognize or celebrate colonial oppressors and/or which may be offensive or controversial", and specifically artworks deemed to be "offensive" in their depiction of black people. Both Stanley Pinker’s Decline and Fall, which makes ironic use of colonial iconology, and Breyten Breytenbach's Hovering Dog, which shows a black person wearing a white mask and a white person wearing a black mask, were removed; and Diane Victor’s Pasiphaë, which depicts black farmers with allusions to Greek mythology, was covered by a wooden panel. In response, Breyten Breytenbach remarked that UCT were making fools of themselves, while Diane Victor thought UCT's actions were "slightly comical" and her artwork was being understood on a "simplistic level".

Jacques Rousseau, then chair of the Academic Freedom Committee, told GroundUp: "There are a number of artworks in UCT's collection that could legitimately be regarded as problematic. Even so, any piece of art is potentially offensive to someone, and the very point of art is to provoke reflection and sometimes discomfort." The Academic Freedom Committee noted with "grave concern recent instances of threats to academic freedom".

The South African Human Rights Commission was investigating the matter as of May 2017, in order to determine whether the university was infringing on the constitutional right to freedom of expression, in particular the right to artistic creativity.

Popular culture 
The university was the shooting location of the 2019 film Critters Attack! where it was called Leroy College and the 2008 film Disgrace.

The university was the shooting location of Netflix movies The Kissing Booth and The Kissing Booth 2 and the 2020 Netflix series Blood & Water. The Upper Campus residence served as the grounds and building for the show's fictional Parkhurst College.

Gallery

See also 

 Centre for Curating the Archive
 List of universities in South Africa
 Education in South Africa
 Chancellor of the University of Cape Town
 Open access in South Africa and List of South African open access repositories
 List of demonstrations at the University of Cape Town

References

External links

 
 Statute of the University of Cape Town, Government Notice No. 1199, 20 September 2002.
 Southern African University
 UCT OpenContent - Open Educational Resource website

 
1829 establishments in the Cape Colony
2021 fires in Africa
University of Cape Town
Educational institutions established in 1829
Institutes associated with CERN
Public universities in South Africa
Rondebosch
Universities in the Western Cape